Bushong is a surname found mostly in the United States, derived from the surname Boschung found mainly in Switzerland, but also in the Palatinate and other regions in Western Europe.

Surname history
The American surname, Bushong and variant Bushon, prior to being anglicized, was the German-Swiss name, Boschung. The spelling was changed after immigration to Colonial America. The immigrants, Hans and Johann Nicholas both arrived as Boschung, Hans in 1731 and Johann Nicholas in 1732. The original ships manifests and transcriptions list them as Boschung, but the spelling was changed in their American lives.

The origin and meaning of the Bushong surname
One favored theory is the surname is based on two syllables, Bosch and ung. Bosch is considered a Germanic topographical name, derived from the Latin word, boscus which translates to wood, as in forest. Subsequently, the patronymic suffix ung was added to the original name and means descendants of (the Bosch). It has been theorized that the reason to differentiate from an original Bosch family, with the addition of the suffix, was that there had been a large well established Bosch family. The patronymic suffix identified them as having separated by proximity from the original family. In other words, the families who moved away were not the Bosch, they were the Boschung. All occurring as surnames were beginning to be the accepted practice.

Origination of the Boschung family
There are several Boschung family lines, originating in Switzerland,  one of which started in 1750, when a line Bosson, changed its names spelling to Boschung. Another line began in 1600 in Boltigen, Switzerland, with a name change from Studer, and this is believed to be beginning of the Colonial American Bushong. However, the Boschung name is first noted in the 1520s in Jaun, Fribourg, Switzerland and in the 1530s a few miles away in the Canton of Bern, Switzerland. These families whether related or not represent the majority of the Boschung. All would have been spoken a Swiss German dialect, more specifically its predecessor western High Alemannic dialect (Bernese German).

Colonial period immigration to the United States

For the vast majority, the Bushong Family of America descend from two immigrants, Hans Boschung and Johann Nicholas Boschung.  Hans and Johann Nicholas Boschung arrived in port of Philadelphia, Pennsylvania in 1731 and 1732 respectively. They were Protestants of the Reformed Swiss sect, who left Switzerland and spent some years in the Palatinate.

Hans Boschung immigrated with his family on the ship Brittania and qualified for entry to the Colonies September 21, 1731. They were listed, Barbara age 37, and their children, Magdelen age 11, Hans Phillip age 9, Ana Barbara age 6, Christiana age 3.

Johann Nicholas Boschung immigrated with his family on the ill-fated voyage of the pink John and William and qualified for entry to the Colonies October 17, 1732. Listed on the manifest as Paschun, with his wife, Magdalena (over 16) and their children, Hendrich, Eve, Andreas, Maria.

The Bushongs originally settled in Lancaster County, Pennsylvania, where they were members of the Salem Hellers Reformed Church.
 Today descendants who can trace their ancestry back to Hans and Johann Nicholas Bushong number in the thousands.

Post-colonial immigration to the United States

There are a few other family lines with the Bushong surname in America. Some are descended from French Catholics who immigrated from Nova Scotia, Canada to the United States in the 19th and 20th century while others are descended from slaves of the Bushongs prior to the American Civil War. There also appear to be a few different lines of European Bushongs. These families immigrated to the United States in the mid to late 19th century from what was a war torn central Europe and took the Bushong name. But with about 1.2 million other mostly Germans immigrants, there was at least one Greek Bushong. Their surnames all had various original spellings, Bushing, Busching, Buchen, Bushan, and others. During this period the most common immigration destination in the United States was New York, through Ellis Island.

Descendant Bushong lines

Some common Bushong myths

The colonial immigrant Bushongs descend from Beauchamp

In the beginning of the 20th century, it was thought that Colonial Bushongs descended from the French Beauchamps and that the name was originally spelled that way. It is not certain exactly when the myth originated, but in 1900 Oscar Kuhns published The Germans and Swiss settlements of colonial Pennsylvania: a study of the so-called Pennsylvania Dutch. In it he stated the Bushongs were French Huguenots and their name was originally Beauchamp...

Rev. A. Stapleton published this book in 1901-
"Memorials of the Huguenots in America, with special reference to their emigration to Pennsylvania"

Multiple lines of colonial Bushongs immigrated

One theory fostered by some, was that there were numerous different lines of Bushongs entering Colonial America, some with different spellings. To date there is no evidence to support this theory and to the contrary, thousands of Bushong descendants are listed as descendants of Hans Boschung and Johann Nicholas Boschung's son, Andreas. With a charting project for the entire Bushong 1930 United States Census completed and most identified, it makes multiple lines that much more improbable.

Bosang descend from Bushong

This myth was first mentioned in the late 1980s or early 1990s by several Bushong researchers, who perceived a similarity between the surnames Bosang and Bushong. It was suggested that David Bosang, whose name was spelled Bosseng before it was Anglicized, had been a Bushong in Europe prior to leaving. Though lacking any European documentation, the myth gained a degree of legitimacy through repeated publishing of Bosang's United States documentation mixed with the Bushong name.  It is probable that Bosseng is a variant spelling of the surname Bossong.

Some notable people, places, and businesses

Dr. Lee C. Bushong, U.S. Marine, deputy sheriff, and professor. 
Albert J. "Doc" Bushong D.D.S., Baseball player, Dentist
Howard F. Bushong, American baseball coach
Robert Grey Bushong, U.S. House of Representatives, Pennsylvania
Bushong, Kansas
Bushong's Mill Covered Bridge, Lancaster County, Pennsylvania

Notes

References

Further reading
I. Daniel Rupp, A Collection of Upwards of Thirty Thousand Names of German, Swiss, Dutch, French and Other Immigrants in Pennsylvania 2nd Edition, Copyright 1898
Wikipedia Swiss Folklore
Find Most Bushongs in the Bushong United Family Tree

Surnames of Swiss origin